A national census in Germany was held every five years from 1875 to 1910. After the World Wars, only a few full population censuses have been held, the last in 1987. The most recent census, though not a national census, was the 2011 European Union census.

Early history 

Nuremberg in 1471 held a census, to be prepared in case of a siege. Brandenburg-Prussia in 1683 began to count its rural population. The first systematic population survey on the European continent was taken in 1719 in the Mark Brandenburg of the Kingdom of Prussia, in order to prepare the first general census of 1725. 

In Habsburg ruled Austria, a population count had been introduced in 1754, but due to resistance by nobility and clerics, no full census was held after 1769. A century and many political changes later, census resumed in 1869, and were held also in 1880, 1890, 1900, 1910, in the same years as the German Empire census. Between the wars, census were held in 1920, 1923, 1934 and 1939, to be resumed in 1951 with a ten-year occurrence.

For 1806, a population of 24,241,000 for several Imperial Circles is quoted in the "Statistik des deutschen Reiches", even though the old Holy Roman Empire had fallen apart, and a new German Empire did not exist yet as a political entity. By 1821, the population within the newly founded German Confederation had grown to over 30 million.

German Zollverein (1834–1867) 

When the German Confederation had been founded in 1815, some states had been anxious to prove they had a small population in order to contribute fewer soldiers to the Federal Army. On the other hand, when the first custom union between southern states were formed, they wanted to show they had a large population in order to claim a larger share of the custom revenue. The German Customs Union, the Zollverein, conducted population counts from 1834 to 1867, every three years on 3 December, in order to share its revenue among the member states accordingly. The date of 3 December was chosen as most people of the „Zollabrechnungsbevölkerung“, the custom accounting population, were expected to be at home then. The Eastern parts of Prussia remained outside of the Confederation for most of the time, but the whole of Prussia was part of the Zollverein. While most states joined the Zollverein sooner or later, the Austrian Empire never did until the German Confederation and the Zollverein broke up in the civil war of 1866. The Zollverein regrouped and held another census in 1867, but the census of 1870 was postponed due to the ongoing Franco-German War and the foundation of the German Empire.

German Empire, Weimar Republic and Nazi Germany (1871–1945) 
Starting in 1871, the census resumed in the newly united German Empire, continuing every five years from 1875 to 1910. The first large-scale census in the German Empire took place in 1895 (see German census of 1895). 

The last pre-war census was held on 1 December 1910, the 1915 census was canceled, but two war censuses were held on 5 December 1916 and 1917 to organize the sharing of food. On 8 October 1919 and 16 June 1925, regular census resumed.

The 1930 census was delayed by the Depression until 1933, and another one was carried out in 1939, both were affected by the bias of the Nazi government. Initially planned for 1937, the 1939 census now also included the areas of Austria, Sudetenland and Memelland. About 750,000 counters covered 22 million households and roughly 80 million inhabitants. Made in atmosphere of terror, attacks on members of Polish minority, and demolishing of Polish shops and libraries, the census resulted in many Poles living in Germany giving their nationality as German out of fear of losing life or well-being of their families. 

After the Second World War the occupying powers started to count the population in their zones, first the Soviets on 1 December 1945, then the French on 26 January 1946. On 29 October 1946, a census was held in all four zones.

Ethnic minorities in 1900 

According to the census of 1900, among the total population of 56,367,178 there were 51,883,131 with German language as their first and only language, plus 252,918 bilingual Germans. The largest minority was the Polish, with 3,086,489 (not including 142,049 Masurians and 100,213 Kashubians). The census results also listed the districts with a minority larger than 5%, including many districts in which German speakers were a minority.

East Germany (1949–1990)
The German Democratic Republic held four census during its existence, of which only the 1964 results were published in full. Unlike most European countries, which saw a significant growth of their populations, the GDR suffered a drop. Until the building of the Berlin Wall in 1961, over three million Germans had defected from the GDR to West Germany. As many young adults had chosen to leave, this also affected the numbers of babies born in the following decades.

Federal Republic of Germany (formerly known as West Germany) (since 1949) 
 

In the 1980s, attempts at introducing a census in West Germany sparked strong popular resentment since some felt that the questions to be asked were quite personal. Comparisons to Orwell's 1984 were drawn. Some campaigned for a boycott, or for intentional false statements. The Constitutional Court stopped the census in 1983, and required a revision of the process. The modified census was eventually held in 1987.

For 1991 a concurrent census in both West and East Germany had been planned, but it was canceled due to reunification, and replaced by a "micro census" population sample among 1 percent of house holds. Due to reunification and immigration from former Eastern Bloc states and the war-torn Balkans, the population has grown to c. 82 million in the 1990s, but no census has been held since 1987. As of July 2017  The CIA Factbook estimates the population at 80,159,662, and ranks Germany as 19th  in the world.
Former population censuses in Germany were complete enumerations obtained directly from the entire population in personal interviews or by questionnaire. For the 1987 population census, some 500 000 enumerators were required and for 2011, a change in methodology was planned, and the costs of the largely register-based census were expected to be only about one third of the expenditure of a traditional population census. Mainly the data already stored in the registers of the administrative authorities, in the population registers of the municipalities and the registers of the Federal Employment Agency was  used. Additional data, like information on education, training and occupation, would be collected by an interview-based sample survey. The data on buildings and dwellings, for which there are no registers in Germany, would be collected by mail from all owners.

See also
 Statistisches Bundesamt (Destatis)
 Demographics of Germany
 Judenzählung

Literature
 Kaiserliches Statistisches Amt (Hrsg.): Statistisches Jahrbuch für das Deutsche Reich, 1880–1918
 Statistisches Reichsamt (Hrsg.): Statistisches Jahrbuch für das Deutsche Reich, 1919–1941/42
 Statistisches Bundesamt (Hrsg.): Statistisches Jahrbuch für die Bundesrepublik Deutschland, 1952 ff.
 Staatliche Zentralverwaltung für Statistik (Hrsg.): Statistisches Jahrbuch der Deutschen Demokratischen Republik, 1955–1989

References

External links 
 Destatis zum nächsten Zensus 2011
 Historisch-Geographisches Informationssystem (HGIS)
Historical facts about the German Minority Census of 1939
 GeoHive mit Daten und Resultaten von Volkszählungen weltweit
 Transkription der Volkszählungen in Schleswig-Holstein 1769 bis 1864
 Volkszählung vom 3.12.1852 im Kgr. Hannover

 
Government of Germany